The 2004–05 Arab Champions League was the second edition of a new format called Arab Champions League replacing the former Arab Unified Club Championship. The teams represented Arab nations from Africa and Asia. Al-Ittihad Jeddah of Saudi Arabia won the final against CS Sfaxien of Tunisia.

The competition's sponsor ART invited Iraq's Al-Talaba to compete. The Iraqi FA then nominated two other clubs (Erbil SC and Najaf FC, leaders of the Northern and Southern groups when the domestic championship was abandoned in spring 2004) to participate alongside Al-Talaba, but UAFA only allowed Al-Talaba to compete. The Iraqi FA then withdrew Al-Talaba from the tournament and were subsequently suspended from UAFA.

First round
Al-Hussein SC (Irbid) apparently replaced Al-Wehdat SC.

|}

Group stage

Group A

Group B

Group C

Group D

Knock-out stage

Quarterfinals

CS Sfaxien won 4–2 on aggregate.

Al-Ittihad 1–1 MC Alger on aggregate. Al-Ittihad won 5–4 on penalties.

Al-Ahli Jeddah won 2–1 on aggregate.

Al-Hilal won 2–1 on aggregate.

Semifinals

CS Sfaxien won 7–4 on aggregate.

Al-Ittihad won 3–1 on aggregate.

Third place match

Al-Hilal won 5–3 on aggregate.

Final

Al-Ittihad won 4–1 on aggregate.

Winners

External links
Arab Champions' League 2004–05 – rsssf.com

Arab Champions League, 2004-05
Arab Champions League, 2004-05
Arab Champions League, 2004-05
Arab Champions League, 2004-05
Arab Club Champions Cup